The 2022–23 season is Chelsea Football Club's 117th year in existence and 34th consecutive season in the top flight of English football. In addition to the domestic league, Chelsea are participating in this season's editions of the FA Cup, EFL Cup and UEFA Champions League. The season covers the period from 1 July 2022 to 30 June 2023.

Kits

Season summary

Pre-season
On 23 May, it was announced that long serving goalkeeping coach Christophe Lollichon would leave the club after having joined from Rennes in 2007 to help with the training of former goalkeeper Petr Čech.

On 28 May, Chelsea released a statement via the club website stating that "Chelsea Football Club can confirm that a final and definitive agreement was entered into last night to sell the Club to the Todd Boehly/Clearlake Capital consortium. It is expected that the transaction will be completed on Monday."

The consortium led by Todd Boehly, chairman and CEO of Eldridge Industries, and Clearlake Capital, announced completion of the ownership transfer of Chelsea on 30 May 2022. The consortium also includes Hansjörg Wyss, founder of the Wyss Foundation, and Mark Walter, co-founder and CEO of Guggenheim Partners. Walter and Boehly are partial owners of the Los Angeles Dodgers, the Los Angeles Lakers, and the Los Angeles Sparks. The transaction has received all necessary approvals from The Government of the United Kingdom, The Premier League, and other authorities.

It was announced on 20 June that long-serving Chairman Bruce Buck would step-down after 19 years in the role effective on 30 June. A further statement was released on 22 June announcing a new-look Board of Directors including Boehly, Eghbali, Feliciano, Walter, Wyss as well as Jonathan Goldstein, Barbara Charone, Daniel Finkelstein and James Pade. It was also revealed that long serving Marina Granovskaia left the club, with Boehly acting as interim Sporting Director as well as chairman. The club then announced on 27 June that Petr Čech would leave his role as technical and performance advisor at the end of the month.

On 13 July, Chelsea announced their first signing of the season, with English international winger Raheem Sterling joining the club for a reported fee of £47.5 million. Three days later, they completed the signing of Kalidou Koulibaly for a reported fee of £33 million.

August
In the first match of the new Premier League season, Chelsea defeated Everton 1–0 at Goodison Park, with Jorginho scoring a penalty. The second game of the season saw Chelsea face their North London rivals Tottenham Hotspur at Stamford Bridge. After a relatively quiet first half, Chelsea went into the break 1–0 up courtesy of defender Kalidou Koulibaly's first goal for the club – a volley from a Marc Cucurella corner. Tottenham Hotspur midfielder Pierre-Emile Højbjerg equalised in the 68th minute, with Chelsea players and manager, Thomas Tuchel, unhappy that Kai Havertz had been fouled in the build-up to the goal, as well as Tottenham Hotspur forward Richarlison being in an offside position and obstructing Chelsea goalkeeper Édouard Mendy's view of Højbjerg's shot. In the aftermath of the goal, Tuchel squared up to Tottenham Hotspur manager, and former Chelsea boss, Antonio Conte, after Conte's exuberant celebrations. Both managers were shown yellow cards. Chelsea regained the lead through right-back Reece James' composed finish in the 77th minute.

Tottenham Hotspur equalised again in the 96th minute, after Harry Kane had headed in from a corner. Once again, Tuchel and the Chelsea players were unhappy that Tottenham Hotspur defender Cristian Romero had pulled on Marc Cucurella's hair at the previous corner – an incident which had been reviewed by VAR referee Mike Dean. Following the full-time whistle, there was another heated confrontation between Tuchel and Conte, with referee Anthony Taylor showing both straight red cards. In his post-match press conference, Tuchel stated that he was frustrated with the refereeing decisions against his team, and when asked about the supporters' view that Taylor has a history of making decisions against Chelsea, he replied: "I don't think just some of the fans think that. I can assure you the whole dressing room of us, every single person, thinks that". He went on to say that "of course" his players were worried when they had learned of Taylor's appointment to this game, and replied "maybe it would be better" when asked if Taylor should not referee Chelsea games in future. In the third league match, Chelsea travelled to Elland Road to face rivals Leeds United and suffered a heavy 3–0 defeat, the first of the season, leaving them five points behind league leaders Arsenal.

September
During the first week of September long time serving head of international scouting Scott McLachlan left the club. He had been on gardening leave for three months after being in his post for the last eleven years – during which he oversaw both the men's and youth recruitment during a significant portion of the Roman Abramovich era. On 6 September, Chelsea started their UEFA Champions League campaign away to Dinamo Zagreb, losing 1–0.  Shortly after the loss, Tuchel was sacked by the club. On 8 September, Chelsea announced Graham Potter as their new head coach. Potter's debut match for Chelsea saw the Blues’ draw against Red Bull Salzburg 1–1 in a home Champions League match, with a Raheem Sterling goal.

October
In Potter's second match, Chelsea defeated Crystal Palace 2–1 away from home. In his third match in charge, Chelsea trounced Milan 3–0 at Stamford Bridge, improving their position in the Champions League. They also won the reverse fixture away from home 2–0 top go top of their group. In between the two UCL games, Chelsea easily dispatched of Wolverhampton, 3–0. Overall, Potter won four and drew one of his first five matches in charge. Chelsea's good form continued, as they defeated Aston Villa 2–0 on the road, with a Mason Mount brace. The next two fixtures were drawn by Chelsea, damaging their title aspirations, first against Brentford away and then against Manchester United at home, 0–0 and 1–1 respectively.

However, in the next 13 league matches, Chelsea only managed 2 wins and 4 draws, while sustaining seven losses. As a result, the team dropped to 10th. They were also out of both the Carabao Cup and FA Cup after losing to Manchester City in the third round of both competitions.

Management team

Players

Squad information
Players and squad numbers last updated on 18 February 2023. Appearances include all competitions.Note: Flags indicate national team as has been defined under FIFA eligibility rules. Players may hold more than one non-FIFA nationality.

Transfers

In

Summer

Winter

Loan in

Summer

Winter

Out

Summer

Winter

Loans out

Summer

Winter

Notes

Overall transfer activity

Expenditure
Summer:  £260,100,000

Winter:  £295,400,000

Total:  £555,500,000

Income
Summer:  £56,900,000

Winter:  £12,000,000

Total:  £68,900,000

Net totals
Summer:  £203,200,000

Winter:  £285,400,000

Total:  £488,600,000

Pre-season and friendlies
Chelsea announced they would travel to the United States to take part in the FC Series with a friendly against Arsenal. A month later the club announced two further fixtures as part of the FC Series, against América and Charlotte FC. On 6 July, Chelsea confirmed they would play Udinese in Italy after the American tour.

During the mid-season winter break, The club announced a friendly with Aston Villa in Abu Dhabi.

Competitions

Overall record

Premier League

League table

Results summary

Results by round

Matches

The league fixtures were announced on 16 June 2022.

FA Cup

Chelsea entered the competition at the third round stage and were drawn away to Manchester City.

EFL Cup

UEFA Champions League

Group stage

Knockout phase

Round of 16
The round of 16 draw was held on 7 November 2022.

Chelsea were drawn against German side Borussia Dortmund in the round of 16, with the first leg away from home as they progressed as group winners.

Quarter-finals
The quarter-finals draw was held on 17 March 2023.

Chelsea were drawn against Spanish side and defending champions Real Madrid, with the first leg away from home.

Statistics

Appearances

Goalscorers

Top assists

Clean sheets

Discipline

Awards

Players

References

Chelsea F.C. seasons
Chelsea
Chelsea
Chelsea
Chelsea
Chelsea